The 1996 CAF Super Cup was the fourth CAF Super Cup, an annual football match in Africa organized by the Confederation of African Football (CAF), between the 1995 African Cup of Champions Clubs Orlando Pirates against the 1995 African Cup Winners' Cup Kabylie.

The match took place on 2 March 1996, in Cape Town, South Africa, between the South African club Orlando Pirates and the Algerian club Kabylie.

Teams

Match details

References

1996
Super
Orlando Pirates F.C. matches
JS Kabylie matches